The second season of The Real Housewives of Salt Lake City, an American reality television series, is broadcast on Bravo. It premiered on September 12, 2021 and was primarily filmed in Salt Lake City, Utah. Its executive producers are Lisa Shannon, Dan Peirson, Lori Gordon, Chaz Morgan and Andy Cohen.

Season 2 of the Real Housewives of Salt Lake City focuses on the lives of Lisa Barlow, Mary Cosby, Heather Gay, Meredith Marks, Whitney Rose, Jen Shah and Jennie Nguyen. It premiered on September 12, 2021.

Production and Crew
In February 2021, the show was renewed for a second season by Bravo. Lisa Shannon, Dan Peirson, Lori Gordon, Chaz Morgan and Andy Cohen are recognized as the season's executive producers; it is produced and distributed by Shed Media.

Cast
Lisa Barlow, Mary Cosby, Heather Gay, Meredith Marks, Whitney Rose and Jen Shah all returned for the second season, joined by new housewife Jennie Nguyen. Angie Harrington made multiple guest appearances.

 Mary Cosby did not attend this reunion.

Episodes

References

External links
 

 

2021 American television seasons
2022 American television seasons
Salt Lake City (season 2)